Virgilio Teixeira may refer to:

Virgilio Teixeira (actor) (1917–2010),  Portuguese actor
Virgilio Teixeira (footballer) (born 1973), Portuguese-Dutch footballer

See also
Teixeira (disambiguation)